Richard's Things is a 1980 British drama film directed by Anthony Harvey and starring Liv Ullmann, Amanda Redman and Peter Burton. It is written by Frederic Raphael and based on his 1973 novel of the same name. It entered the 37th Venice International Film Festival.

Plot
On the death of the title character Richard, his widow discovers he had a secret long-term mistress. Despite the initial awkwardness between the two women, they soon begin to bond - and have a lesbian relationship.

Main cast
 Liv Ullmann - Kate Morris
 Amanda Redman - Josie
 Peter Burton - Colonel
 Tim Pigott-Smith - Peter
 Elizabeth Spriggs - Mrs Sells 
 David Markham - Morris
 Mark Eden - Richard
 Gwen Taylor - Margaret
 John Vine - Doctor Mace
 Michael Maloney - Bill
 Tracey Childs - Joanna
 Margaret Lacey - Miss Beale

References

External links

1980 films
1980 LGBT-related films
Adultery in films
Female bisexuality in film
British LGBT-related films
British romantic drama films
Films scored by Georges Delerue
Films about grieving
Films about widowhood
Films directed by Anthony Harvey
LGBT-related romantic drama films
1980 romantic drama films
1980s English-language films
1980s British films